Palmer Griffiths (first ¼ 1880 – first ¼ 1973) was a Welsh rugby union, and professional rugby league footballer who played in the 1900s.

Background
Palmer Griffiths' birth was registered in Pontypridd district, Wales, and his death aged 93 was registered in Pontypridd district, Wales.

Playing career

Notable tour matches
Palmer Griffiths scored a try in Penygraig RFC's 3–11 defeat by Australia in the 1908–09 Australia rugby union tour of Britain match at King George's Park, Tonypandy (Athletic Ground), Tonypandy on Saturday 10 October 1908.

Club career
Palmer Griffiths was transferred from Merthyr Tydfil to Swinton during the 1909–10 season.

References

External links
Search for "Griffiths" at rugbyleagueproject.org

1880 births
1973 deaths
Merthyr Tydfil RLFC players
Penygraig RFC players
Rugby league players from Pontypridd
Rugby union players from Pontypridd
Rugby league fullbacks
Rugby union forwards
Swinton Lions players
Welsh rugby league players
Welsh rugby union players